Novembrine Waltz is the fourth studio album by Italian progressive/melodic metal Novembre. Vocals vary between clean-singing, death metal growling, and harsh black metal screams. The album features more gothic elements than the previous releases, and contains many "European" elements, such as the accordion on "Distances", or the chanting on "Everasia"

Track listing

All music/lyrics by Novembre except Track 5 - "Cloudbusting" by Kate Bush

 "Distances" – 6:17
 "Everasia" – 8:23
 "Come Pierrot" – 6:30
 "Child of the Twilight" – 6:35
 "Cloudbusting" (Kate Bush cover) – 5:09
 "Flower" – 6:26
 "Valentine" – 7:21
 "Venezia Dismal" – 6:03
 "Conservatory Resonance" – 7:10

Personnel

Full-time members

 Carmelo Orlando – guitar, vocals.
 Giuseppe Orlando – drums.
 Demian Cristiani – bass.

Session musicians

 Massimiliano Pagliuso – guitars
 Fabio Sanges – keyboards
 Ann-Mari Edvardsen – vocals on Track 5 - "Cloudbusting"

Artwork

The cover art is by Travis Smith. Smith has also produced the cover artwork for Novembre's later albums Materia (2006) and The Blue (2007).

External links
Novembrine Waltz by Novembre @ Encyclopaedia Metallum

Novembre albums
2001 albums
Albums with cover art by Travis Smith (artist)